Michael J. Duarte is an American sportswriter and reporter with the KNBC-TV broadcast team in Los Angeles.

Early life and career 
Duarte is a native of Los Angeles, where he participated in soccer, track, cross country, football, baseball, and basketball. He earned his undergraduate degree at the University of California Santa Barbara, where he won the Paul Lazurus Screenwriting Scholarship Award and the Corwin Writing Award. After stints as a freelance writer for online sports publications, Duarte became the sports editor for the Newsweek Group's Latin Times in 2014, where he wrote and oversaw a team of sportswriters covering the global and Los Angeles sports market until 2016. Duarte joined the NBC team in Los Angeles as a beat writer for the Los Angeles Dodgers in 2015 and ascended to the role as a Southern California sports columnist, regularly writing about the Los Angeles Lakers, Rams, USC Trojans, and more.

Duarte was named the 2019 Sports Journalist of the Year by the prestigious Southern California Journalism Awards in the fall of 2020. He is a two-time short-list nominee in the category of "Best Online Sports News or Feature" and one-time short list nominee in the category of "Best Online Sports Commentary". He was the recipient of the 2019 Award for the "Best Sports News of Feature, Online" for his article entitled, "One Year After the Borderline Tragedy, Love and Sports Help Provide Strength to a Grieving Community". In addition to writing and reporting, Duarte is a frequent guest on national sports television and radio. He is the co-host of the Bleav in Lakers podcast on the Bleav Podcast Network and is one of the hosts and founders of the Bolts by the Horns podcast.

References 

Living people
American sportswriters
American reporters and correspondents
People from Los Angeles
Year of birth missing (living people)